Mitu is a Romanian surname. Notable people with the surname include:

Andreea Mitu (born 1991), Romanian tennis player
Dumitru Mitu (born 1975), Romanian former footballer
Gogea Mitu (1914–1936), Romanian boxer
Marius Mitu (born 1976), Romanian footballer
Petre Mitu (born 1977), Romanian rugby union player

See also

Mito (name)

Romanian-language surnames